Pita Swarga Pita Dharma is a 2000 Bengali film directed by Milan Bhowmik. The film's music was composed by Soumitra Kundu.

Cast
 Abhishek Chatterjee
 Satabdi Roy
 Lily Chakravarty
 Anupam Kher
 Biplab Chatterjee
 Subhendu Chatterjee

Soundtrack

References

External links
 Pita Swarga Pita Dharma at the Gomolo

2000 films
Bengali-language Indian films
2000s Bengali-language films